The 2014 Netball Superleague season (known for sponsorship reasons as the Zeo Netball Superleague) was the ninth season of the Netball Superleague. The league was won by Manchester Thunder. Surrey Storm finished top of the table following the regular season and remained unbeaten throughout the season until they were defeated in the grand final by Manchester Thunder. This season the league was sponsored by Zeo, a soft drinks firm.

Teams

Regular season
Surrey Storm finished top of the table following the regular season with a record of twelve wins and two draws.

Final table

Playoffs

Semi-finals

3rd/4th place playoff

Grand Final

References

 
2014
 
netball